Scott William Weenink (born 1 January 1973) is a New Zealand businessman, former first-class cricketer and representative rugby player.

Weenink was born at Christchurch in January 1973. He later studied at Victoria University of Wellington, and while studying there he played representative cricket for Wellington in the 1995/96 and 1996/97 seasons, making six first-class appearances in the Shell Trophy and seven List A one-day appearances in the Shell Cup. In first-class cricket, Weenink scored 100 runs for Wellington at an average of exactly 10 and a high score of 40. With his off break bowling, he took 4 wickets with these all coming in one innings against Central Districts. In List A one-day matches, he scored 142 runs at an average of 20.28, with a high score of 113 against Central Districts.

Weenink undertook postgraduate studies in England at Wolfson College at the University of Oxford. While studying at Oxford, he played first-class cricket on six occasions in 2000, with five appearances for an Oxford Universities side, a forerunner of Oxford UCCE which was formed in 2001. Weenink scored 124 runs in his five matches, with a high score of 72 not out. As a bowler, he took 5 wickets with best figures of 3 for 121. He also made an appearance for Oxford University against Cambridge University in The University Match at Lord's where he was awarded a University of Oxford Cricket Blue.

Weenink also played representative rugby for various Wellington teams and while studying at Oxford he played in the 1999 Varsity Match at Twickenham versus Cambridge University and was also awarded a University of Oxford Rugby Blue.

After graduating from Oxford University, Weenink entered into business. After a period as a lawyer in private practise, Weenink was the general counsel and company secretary for Auckland Airport from 2016 until he joined Modica Group in late 2018. Weenink is also a board director of several companies, including Generate KiwiSaver Funds Management and Enable Networks.

References

External links

1973 births
Living people
People from Christchurch
New Zealand cricketers
Wellington cricketers
Victoria University of Wellington alumni
University of Waikato alumni
Alumni of Wolfson College, Oxford
Oxford Universities cricketers
Oxford University cricketers